Bispherical coordinates are a three-dimensional orthogonal coordinate system that results from rotating the two-dimensional bipolar coordinate system about the axis that connects the two foci.

Definition
The most common definition of bispherical coordinates  is

The coordinates ranges are -∞ <  < ∞, 0 ≤  ≤  and 0 ≤  ≤ 2.

Coordinate surfaces
Surfaces of constant  correspond to intersecting tori of different radii

that all pass through the foci but are not concentric.  The surfaces of constant  are non-intersecting spheres of different radii

that surround the foci. The centers of the constant- spheres lie along the -axis, whereas the constant- tori are centered in the  plane.

Inverse formulae

The formulae for the inverse transformation are:

where  and

Scale factors

whereas the azimuthal scale factor equals

Thus, the infinitesimal volume element equals

and the Laplacian is given by

Applications
The classic applications of bispherical coordinates are in solving partial differential equations, 
e.g., Laplace's equation, for which bispherical coordinates allow a 
separation of variables.  However, the Helmholtz equation is not separable in bispherical coordinates. A typical example would be the electric field surrounding two conducting spheres of different radii.

References

Bibliography

External links
MathWorld description of bispherical coordinates

Three-dimensional coordinate systems
Orthogonal coordinate systems